Iñaki Laskurain González (born in Eibar, on 5 August 1968) is a Spanish former rugby player and coach, who played as flanker. He was the President of the Basque Rugby Federation between 2013 and 2020.

Career
He mostly played for Getxo Artea RT, with which he played 9 seasons and won 4 Copa del Rey de Rugby titles, 1 División de Honor title. 
Laskurain also played for Eibar RT, Aviron Bayonnais and Atlético San Sebastián. He was also an international for Spain, with his first senior cap being against France at Estadio Nacional Complutense, Madrid, on 28 April 1991 and his last international cap was during the test match against Scotland in Madrid, on 6 May 1995.
He also played for Spain U23 and Spain sevens, disputing the 1993 Rugby World Cup Sevens for the latter. He also played Basque Country national team at the San Mamés stadium in 1989. Outside the fields, he worked as an insurance broker.

Coaching career
Laskurain first coached Durango RT between 2005 and 2007. Later, he coached Bera Bera RT between 2007 and 2009 until being sacked. He also coached the Basque Country national team.

References

External links
Iñaki Laskurain international statistics at ESPN Scrum

1968 births
Aviron Bayonnais players
Living people
Rugby union players from the Basque Country (autonomous community)
Spanish rugby union players
Rugby union flankers
Spain international rugby union players
Sportspeople from Eibar